The 2015 wildfire season was the largest in Washington state history, with more than  burning across the state from June to September. As many as 3,000 firefighters including 800 Washington National Guard members were deployed to fight the fires. The 17th Field Artillery Brigade of the United States Army also deployed 200 soldiers from Joint Base Lewis–McChord to help fight the fires.

On August 21, President Barack Obama declared the fires a federal emergency. On August 24, the Washington Department of Natural Resources announced the Okanogan Complex fire had become the largest fire complex in Washington State history.

The Washington State Department of Natural Resources called the season the "worst-ever" in the state's history.

Progression and response

June

By June 23, there had already been 313 wildfires across the state.

Governor's action
Governor Jay Inslee issued a proclamation on June 26, declaring a state of emergency to exist in all Washington state counties, implementing the Washington State Comprehensive Emergency Management Plan, and ordering deployment of National Guard and other organized militia for incident-related service assistance, all because of the predicted risk of wildfires in the wake of significantly drier-than-average weather in June. The Commissioner of Public Lands Peter J. Goldmark, head of the Washington Department of Natural Resources, issued an updated burn ban to the one issued June 22, as the earlier ban was superseded by the Governor's proclamation. The Commissioner's prohibition of campfires in state forests, state parks and state forestlands until September 30, 2015, was issued June 26, 2015.

Sleepy Hollow fire

The season began unprecedentedly early with the Sleepy Hollow Fire on June 28, affecting the city of Wenatchee in Chelan County, Washington. It burned 2,950 acres, destroying 29 homes and several commercial buildings. The cause of the fire is under investigation but is "likely human-caused". Officials said the fire's unusual intensity was caused by drought and record high temperatures. As a safety precaution, officials banned Fourth of July fireworks in many parts of the state. A man was arrested in connection with the fire, confessing to starting it with a disposable lighter, but faced no charges due to his mental illness.

July
By July 12, over 16,000 acres had burned, including a single fire near Ephrata, in Grant County, that had burned at least 10,000 acres. Later in the month, another major fire was triggered by farm equipment near Walla Walla and burned more than 6,000 acres over two weeks.

August

The extent of wildfires in August 2015 led to the federal declaration of a state of emergency in Washington state by President Barack Obama on August 21, 2015.

On August 29 there was concern that unusually strong southerly winds would cause "significant growth" of the Tunk Block and Lime Belt fires in the Okanogan complex and growth in the Chelan complex fires. The Twisp River and Nine Mile fires were about 95 percent contained.

Chelan Complex

Three fires on the south end of Lake Chelan, near the city of Chelan, merged into a complex fire and forced the immediate evacuation of over 1,000 residents on August 14. According to Rico Smith, a spokesman for the firefighters near Chelan, by August 29 "about 85 homes, businesses and other residences [had] been destroyed by the Chelan complex fires."

Okanogan Complex

The Federal Emergency Management Agency (FEMA) authorized the use of federal grants on August 14 for the Nine Mile Fire, one of the five fires that are part of the Okanogan Complex, determining that it constituted a "major disaster". Over 1,300 residents in the towns of Twisp and Winthrop were ordered to evacuate because of the approaching Twisp River Fire. On August 19, 2015, three firefighters were killed battling a wildfire near Twisp.

By August 28 "at least 45 primary residences, 49 cabins and 60 outbuildings [were] destroyed in the Okanogan complex fires."

September

International assistance
After the emergency declaration in August, President Obama asked Australian Fire Services (including those of the Black Saturday bushfires) to aid the depleted American services. By August 24, about 70 fire managers from Australia and New Zealand arrived at the National Interagency Fire Center in Boise, Idaho, to be briefed and provided with gear before heading west to fight the fires.

Air quality

As a result of the wildfires, air quality across the state and into Canada dropped to unhealthy levels in many cities and led to the issuing of several air quality alerts by the U.S. National Weather Service and Environment Canada. The city of Spokane,  from the fires, reported a rating of 188 on August 24, forcing high school athletics and other outdoor activities to be canceled. By Tuesday, August 25, Environment Canada had posted an Air Quality Health Index alert for cities as far away as Calgary, Alberta——with a score of 12. The Canadian Air Quality Health Index, measured on a scale of one to 10-plus with 10 as "very high risk", is based on measurements of "ozone at ground level, particulate matter and nitrogen dioxide". By Wednesday the third day of the thick haze of smoke, air quality in Calgary scored 17.

Smoke from the Chelan Complex fire was pushed westward over Seattle and the Puget Sound region by upper-level winds on August 22, causing hazy weather and worsened air quality for several days.

Aftermath

In December, Governor Jay Inslee proposed a supplemental budget that included $178 million to cover the costs incurred by the state in fighting the wildfires.

List of fires

Notes

See also
 2015 California wildfires
 2015 Oregon wildfires

References

External links

Inciweb
NWCC – Northwest Fire Locations

wildfires
Washington (state) wildfires
Wildfires in Washington (state) by year